Gert Hendrik Muller (born 10 May 1948) is a former South African rugby union player.

Playing career
Muller represented the  Schools team at the 1965 annual Craven Week tournament and after finishing school, he furthered his studies at Stellenbosch University. He made his senior provincial debut for Western Province in 1969 and in 1972 he relocated to Johannesburg and continued his playing career with Transvaal.

Muller made his test debut for the Springboks in 1969 against the touring Australian team in the third test played at Newlands in Cape Town on 6 September 1969. At the end of 1969 he toured with the Springboks to Britain and Ireland, play in the first test against Scotland as well as the fourth and last test on the tour, against Wales. He also toured with South Africa to Australia in 1971 but broke his nose in a tour match and did not play in any tests. During his career, he played fourteen test matches, scoring four tries, as well as six tour matches, scoring eleven tries, for the Springboks.

Test history

See also
List of South Africa national rugby union players – Springbok no. 361

References

1948 births
Living people
South African rugby union players
South Africa international rugby union players
Western Province (rugby union) players
Golden Lions players
People from Vryheid
Rugby union wings
Rugby union players from KwaZulu-Natal